Goan society
Hinduism in Goa
Religion in Goa